Laminacauda thayerae is a species of sheet weaver found in Chile. It was described by Millidge in 1985.

References

Linyphiidae
Invertebrates of Chile
Spiders of South America
Spiders described in 1985
Endemic fauna of Chile